The 2004–05 Florida Panthers season was cancelled due to the lockout of the players of the National Hockey League.

Off-season
General manager Rick Dudley was fired on May 24, 2004. Two days later Dudley was replaced by the head coach he had fired months earlier, Mike Keenan, while Jacques Martin was named the team’s new head coach.

Schedule
The Panthers preseason and regular season schedules were announced on July 12 and July 14, 2004, respectively.

|-
| 1 || September 26 || @ Nashville Predators
|-
| 2 || September 27 || Carolina Hurricanes
|-
| 3 || September 29 || @ Ottawa Senators
|-
| 4 || October 1 || @ Carolina Hurricanes
|-
| 5 || October 3 || @ Tampa Bay Lightning
|-
| 6 || October 8 || Tampa Bay Lightning
|-

|-
| 1 || October 14 || Philadelphia Flyers
|-
| 2 || October 16 || @ Tampa Bay Lightning
|-
| 3 || October 19 || @ Toronto Maple Leafs
|-
| 4 || October 21 || @ Boston Bruins
|-
| 5 || October 23 || Pittsburgh Penguins
|-
| 6 || October 27 || Atlanta Thrashers
|-
| 7 || October 29 || Nashville Predators
|-
| 8 || October 31 || Washington Capitals
|-
| 9 || November 3 || Montreal Canadiens
|-
| 10 || November 5 || @ New York Rangers
|-
| 11 || November 6 || @ New York Islanders
|-
| 12 || November 9 || @ Ottawa Senators
|-
| 13 || November 12 || Calgary Flames
|-
| 14 || November 14 || Los Angeles Kings
|-
| 15 || November 17 || @ Anaheim Mighty Ducks
|-
| 16 || November 18 || @ Los Angeles Kings
|-
| 17 || November 20 || @ San Jose Sharks
|-
| 18 || November 24 || New Jersey Devils
|-
| 19 || November 26 || Vancouver Canucks
|-
| 20 || November 28 || @ Washington Capitals
|-
| 21 || November 29 || @ Pittsburgh Penguins
|-
| 22 || December 1 || St. Louis Blues
|-
| 23 || December 4 || @ Tampa Bay Lightning
|-
| 24 || December 8 || Montreal Canadiens
|-
| 25 || December 11 || @ Phoenix Coyotes
|-
| 26 || December 13 || @ Colorado Avalanche
|-
| 27 || December 15 || Buffalo Sabres
|-
| 28 || December 17 || Carolina Hurricanes
|-
| 29 || December 19 || @ Buffalo Sabres
|-
| 30 || December 21 || @ Philadelphia Flyers
|-
| 31 || December 23 || @ New York Rangers
|-
| 32 || December 26 || @ Carolina Hurricanes
|-
| 33 || December 27 || New Jersey Devils
|-
| 34 || December 29 || Boston Bruins
|-
| 35 || December 31 || New York Rangers
|-
| 36 || January 4 || @ New York Islanders
|-
| 37 || January 6 || @ Ottawa Senators
|-
| 38 || January 8 || @ Montreal Canadiens
|-
| 39 || January 12 || Washington Capitals
|-
| 40 || January 15 || Tampa Bay Lightning
|-
| 41 || January 17 || Atlanta Thrashers
|-
| 42 || January 19 || Buffalo Sabres
|-
| 43 || January 21 || Boston Bruins
|-
| 44 || January 22 || @ Washington Capitals
|-
| 45 || January 24 || @ Boston Bruins
|-
| 46 || January 26 || Toronto Maple Leafs
|-
| 47 || January 28 || Pittsburgh Penguins
|-
| 48 || January 29 || Carolina Hurricanes
|-
| 49 || February 2 || Chicago Blackhawks
|-
| 50 || February 4 || @ Atlanta Thrashers
|-
| 51 || February 5 || Anaheim Mighty Ducks
|-
| 52 || February 8 || @ New Jersey Devils
|-
| 53 || February 9 || @ Pittsburgh Penguins
|-
| 54 || February 16 || Ottawa Senators
|-
| 55 || February 19 || New York Islanders
|-
| 56 || February 20 || Detroit Red Wings
|-
| 57 || February 22 || @ Toronto Maple Leafs
|-
| 58 || February 24 || @ Montreal Canadiens
|-
| 59 || February 26 || @ Columbus Blue Jackets
|-
| 60 || February 27 || @ Minnesota Wild
|-
| 61 || March 2 || Toronto Maple Leafs
|-
| 62 || March 4 || @ Atlanta Thrashers
|-
| 63 || March 5 || Tampa Bay Lightning
|-
| 64 || March 7 || Ottawa Senators
|-
| 65 || March 9 || Edmonton Oilers
|-
| 66 || March 11 || Washington Capitals
|-
| 67 || March 12 || @ Carolina Hurricanes
|-
| 68 || March 15 || Philadelphia Flyers
|-
| 69 || March 18 || @ Washington Capitals
|-
| 70 || March 19 || Tampa Bay Lightning
|-
| 71 || March 21 || Atlanta Thrashers
|-
| 72 || March 23 || @ Dallas Stars
|-
| 73 || March 24 || @ Nashville Predators
|-
| 74 || March 26 || @ Tampa Bay Lightning
|-
| 75 || March 28 || @ Atlanta Thrashers
|-
| 76 || March 30 || New York Rangers
|-
| 77 || April 1 || New York Islanders
|-
| 78 || April 3 || @ Buffalo Sabres
|-
| 79 || April 5 || @ Philadelphia Flyers
|-
| 80 || April 6 || @ New Jersey Devils
|-
| 81 || April 8 || Carolina Hurricanes
|-
| 82 || April 10 || @ Carolina Hurricanes
|-

Transactions
The Panthers were involved in the following transactions from June 8, 2004, the day after the deciding game of the 2004 Stanley Cup Finals, through February 16, 2005, the day the  season was officially cancelled.

Trades

Players acquired

Players lost

Signings

Draft picks
Florida's picks at the 2004 NHL Entry Draft, which was held at the RBC Center in Raleigh, North Carolina on June 26–27, 2004.

Notes

References

Flo
Flo
Florida Panthers seasons
Florida Panthers
Florida Panthers